Gouritz WMA, or Gouritz Water Management Area (coded: 16), in South Africa includes the following major rivers: the Gouritz River, Olifants River, Kamanassie River, Gamka River, Buffels River, Touws River, Goukou River and Duiwenhoks River, and covers the following Dams:

 Calitzdorp Dam Nels River
 Duiwenhoks Dam Duiwenhoks River
 Ernest Robertson Dam Groot Brak River
 Floriskraal Dam Buffels River
 Gamka Dam Gamka River
 Gamkapoort Dam Gamka River
 Garden Route Dam Swart River
 Haarlem Dam Groot River
 Hartebeestkuil Dam Hartenbos River
 Kammanassie Dam Kammanassie River
 Korentepoort Dam Korinte River
 Leeugamka Dam Leeu River
 Miertjieskraal Dam Brand River
 Oukloof Dam Cordiers River
 Prinsrivier Dam Prins River
 Stompdrift Dam Olifants River
 Wolwedans Dam Groot Brak River

Boundaries 
Primary drainage region J and tertiary drainage regions H80, H90, K10 to K70.

See also 
 Water Management Areas
 List of reservoirs and dams in South Africa
 List of rivers of South Africa

References 

Water Management Areas